Ranchi University is a public state university in Ranchi, Jharkhand, India. It was established in 1960 by an Act of the Bihar legislature. Ranchi University offers degrees in undergraduate, post-graduate, M.Phil. and doctorate programs.

History
Before the establishment of Ranchi University, all degree colleges of the present-day Jharkhand (except Santhal Parganas) were affiliated to the Patna University. Ranchi University was established on July 12, 1960, as a teaching cum affiliating university. When the Ranchi University was first established, all degree colleges of present-day Jharkhand came under its jurisdiction. Bishnudeo Narayan Singh was appointed as the first vice-chancellor of this university.

In 1992, Vinoba Bhave University was created by bifurcating the Ranchi University, reducing its jurisdiction area by nearly half. In 2009, the university was further divided to create two more universities: – Nilamber Pitamber University, Medininagar in January 2009, and Kolhan University, Chaibasa in August 2009. At present, Ranchi University has jurisdiction only over the colleges of the five districts of Jharkhand, namely, Ranchi, Gumla, Khunti, Simdega, and Lohardaga.

Organisation and administration

Governance
Like most state universities in India, the Chancellor of the university is the governor of the state - the Governor of Bihar until the inception of Jharkhand on 15 November 2000 and the Governor of Jharkhand since then. The chief executive of the university is the Vice-Chancellor.

Faculties and departments
Different departments of the Ranchi University was organized into three faculties.

 Faculty of Science

This faculty consists of the departments of Mathematics, Physics, Chemistry, Geology, Botany, and Zoology.

 Faculty of Humanities

This faculty consists of the departments of Bengali, English, Hindi, Sanskrit, Tribal & Regional Language, Urdu, and Philosophy.

 Faculty of Social Sciences and Commerce
This faculty consists of the departments of History, Geography, Anthropology, Political Science, Economics, Home Science, Psychology, Sociology, and Commerce.

Affiliations
Ranchi University is an affiliating university and has jurisdiction over the higher educational institutes of the five districts of Jharkhand: Ranchi district, Gumla district, Khunti district, Simdega district and Lohardaga district. This university has 15 constituent colleges and 29 affiliate colleges under its jurisdiction. These colleges include Medical College, Nursing College, Engineering College, Law College, Institutes of Management, Institute of Psychiatry etc.

Academics

Traditional and distance education
The university and its affiliated colleges and institutions offer undergraduate and postgraduate courses in different areas like medical, nursing, engineering, liberal arts, etc. Ranchi University generally offers postgraduate courses in liberal arts in own campus; while professional and liberal undergraduate degree courses are offered through the affiliated colleges and institutions. Professional postgraduate courses (like M.Tech., MD, Ms) are also offered through the affiliated institutions. Admission in the undergraduate liberal arts degree courses is mainly based on the result of the higher secondary (10+2) examination. However, for admission in the undergraduate courses of professional subjects like medicine and engineering, one has to take an entrance examination conducted by national agencies (NEET UG or JEE). Admission in the postgraduate courses is based on undergraduate degree results and also the performance of the entrance examination conducted either by the university or by the national agency. The aspirants for research-level programs have to take an entrance examination followed by an interview. Ranchi university also has a Directorate of Distance Education for conducting postgraduate studies in distance education.

Libraries
Ranchi University has a central library that has collections of more than 1,00,000 books.

Ranchi University Museum
The department of Anthropology at Ranchi University has a museum that showcases a variety of exhibits including ethnographic collections of central Indian states and Andaman and Nicobar Islands.

Ranking and accreditations
Ranchi University is recognized under Section 12B of the UGC Act. In 2017, the National Assessment and Accreditation Council (NAAC) awarded 'B+' grade to the Ranchi University.

Corruption and White Collar Crimes
University since its inception has undergone many changes, some were acceptable and others inappropriate. University was unable to audit its financial affairs every year, which made it an easy target for officers and staffs for corrupt practices. In 2011, there were instances where registrar and financial officer were engaged in embezzlement of funds provided by UGC for paying arrears to Teaching and Non-Teaching Staff. This was a loss for Ranchi University with accused still on loose. The accused son was arrested, with finance officer still absconding.

In June 2000, the Vigilance Bureau of the Bihar Government arrested its vice chancellor L.C.C.N. Shahdeo for being involved as a mastermind in a racket for appointing undeserving people to the teaching and non-teaching staff of 40 colleges affiliated to the Ranchi University. Student leaders viewed arrest as a politically motivated raid by Vigilance department under the direction of Bihar Government.

D.P. Gupta, the then vice chancellor of Ranchi University, took severe measures to make an audit of Ranchi University books from 1985 onwards. The audit revealed mass scale bungling of exam and registration fees running into crores with university officers colluding with college principals in submitting fake bank challans, payment of bogus T.A. bills worth lakhs of rupees, unlimited over time payments and non maintenance of even cash books over the years. Audit reports revealed financial irregularities and university staff taking help of anti-social elements to terrorise the auditors.

In a meeting of the Public Account Committee of the Jharkhand Assembly held in 2006, Account General (Audit) revealed that heads of various departments, lecturers and non teaching employees of Ranchi University have taken Rs. 6.43 crores as an advance and this amount has not been adjusted to their salaries. In June itself, the RU administration, in response to the matter raised in the State Assembly, instructed the heads of the postgraduate departments and the head of the 34 constituent colleges to submit the expenditure receipts of the advance given to them for conducting examinations. The unaccounted expenses date back to so long that the heads of the departments in whose names the money was issued, have either retired or do not hold those posts any longer.

In April 2007, university administration lodged an FIR against 24 office staff,  involved in embezzlement of funds maintained in Pension and Gratuity Account including other heads of accounts by creating fake documents. It was believed that it involved white collared officials as well.

There was also a case, where an external person/non-employee was working in sensitive Examination department for more than nine months without being caught. On every second day there was question paper leak and tapering of answer sheet.

Furthermore, three teachers were appointed in the constituent college of the university who forged their degree certificate and marksheet. It came to the notice of university administration, but no actions were taken. The accused drew salary for 10 years due to lack of efficiency in incompetent authorities.

A scandal got caught where teachers drawing pension, retired prior to 2016, had their salary fixed under 7th Pay Commission by University Administration and State Government paid lakhs rupees to University for illegal payments.

Salary arrear scam came into light when Ranchi University procured Rs. 99.6 Crores for 1013 teachers, but in legal sense 860 teachers would have to be paid arrears. Department of Higher and Technical Education probed the matter through three members committee and found scam did happened. The department has recommended Governor of Jharkhand to take action against the former vice-chancellor Ramesh Kumar Pandey, finance advisor, finance officer and registrar. Scam files went missing from Ranchi University, when Governor of Jharkhand seeked progress in action taken against erring officials.Governor has ordered to lodge FIR against erring officers.

Embezzlement of total Rs.4 crores is discovered by auditors of Government of Jharkhand, which pertains to 12 April 2010 amounting Rs.20078683, year 2003-2004 to May 2010 amounting Rs.13198183. Under Ranchi Women's College embezzlement is caught for the year 2006-2007;2007-2008 amounting Rs.7382531. And under Science & Technology embezzlement is caught for the year 2000-2001;2001-2002;2002-2003,2003-2004 amounting Rs.847823 & Rs.21855.

Notable alumni

 Babulal Marandi, Indian politician
 Kariya Munda, Indian politician

References

External links

 

 
Universities and colleges in Ranchi
Educational institutions established in 1960
1960 establishments in Bihar